Ali Nazari Juybari (born in Juybar, Mazandaran Province, Iran) is the current former technical director of the club. He was director of the club when Amir Ghalenoi was head coach. He left Esteghlal after Ghalenoi resigns as his position. He was appointed Deputy Chairman of the club in June 2008 by Ali Fathollahzadeh. He was also caretaker chairman of the Esteghlal from May to June 2010.

References

External links

1967 births
Living people
Iranian football chairmen and investors
Iranian sports executives and administrators
People from Juybar